The FIL European Luge Championships 1970 took place in Hammarstrand, Sweden. This event was dominated by the rise of the East German team, who won six of the nine available medals at this championship. It was the first time the championships were held after being cancelled in 1968 and 1969 which were also the last cancellation of the European championships.

Men's singles

Women's singles

Men's doubles

Medal table

References
FIL-Luge.org list of European luge champions  - Accessed January 31, 2008.
Men's doubles European champions
Men's singles European champions
Women's singles European champions

FIL European Luge Championships
1970 in luge
Luge in Sweden
1970 in Swedish sport